Blatno is a settlement in the Municipality of Brežice in eastern Slovenia. The area is part of the traditional region of Styria. It is now included in the Lower Sava Statistical Region.

Churches
There are two churches in the settlement. The first one is dedicated to Saint Bartholomew and belongs to the Parish of Pišece. It was built in 1693. The belfry dates to 1696. Another church. The second one, built north of the settlement on the border with the territory of the neighbouring settlement of Piršenbreg, is dedicated to Saint Barbara. It also belongs to the Parish of Pišece. It was built in the 17th century.

References

External links
Blatno on Geopedia

Populated places in the Municipality of Brežice

nl:Blatno